Perungala is a village in Alappuzha district in the Indian state of Kerala.

Demographics
 India census, Perungala had a population of 13501 with 6362 males and 7139 females.
CPI(M) party is very strong in this area

References

Villages in Alappuzha district